The 2020 Paris Municipal election was a municipal election that took place in Paris on 15 March 2020, alongside other French municipal elections. The second round, which was originally scheduled to be held on 22 March 2020, was postponed due to the COVID-19 pandemic in France. The second round then took place on 28 June 2020, which saw Anne Hidalgo re-elected as Mayor of Paris.

Background

In the 2014 Paris municipal election, Anne Hidalgo of the Socialist Party was elected mayor of Paris, becoming the first woman to hold that position. She had previously served as deputy mayor during Bertrand Delanoë's tenure as mayor.  Hidalgo won with around 55% of the vote in the second round, defeating Nathalie Kosciusko-Morizet of the Union for a Popular Movement who had finished ahead of her in the first round of voting.

While Emmanuel Macron's La République En Marche! (LREM) won 12 of the 18 Paris constituencies during the 2017 French legislative election, the incumbent Hidalgo still retained a narrow lead in polling, even with criticism over the aborted Autolib' carsharing scheme and the debt increase over her term. While LREM initially picked Benjamin Griveaux to run, another major LREM candidate, mathematician Cédric Villani, chose to continue and officially announced his candidacy on 9 September. Macron was reported to have asked Villani to unite behind Griveaux on 26 January to avoid vote splitting, which Villani refused, partially seeing his candidacy as "faithful to the LREM spirit" of grassroots politics. Villani, while of similar popularity to Griveaux, was considered unlikely to win.

On 14 February, Benjamin Griveaux withdrew from the election after leaked sexts allegedly between him and another woman were leaked 48 hours earlier, stating: "For more than a year, my family and I have been subjected to defamatory remarks, lies, rumours, anonymous attacks, the revelation of stolen private conversations and death threats. As if all this was not enough, yesterday a new level was reached." This was arguably unusual, with the French public largely seen as apathetic to politicians and extramarital affairs, an example being François Mitterrand. The leak was condemned on all sides of politics. Jean-Luc Mélenchon of La France Insoumise (LFI) said: "The publication of intimate images to destroy an adversary is odious." Marine Le Pen of National Rally suggested that Griveaux should not have stepped down. Hidalgo, the Socialist Mayor, commented that "Parisians deserve a dignified debate." Villani tweeted: "The attack he has been subject to is a serious threat to our democracy." It has been seen as an intrusion into private life that is considered off limits, with Alexis Corbière of LFI called the "Americanisation" of politics, where "people have to apologise for having lovers or mistresses". Petr Pavlensky, who released the link states it was to expose his hypocrisy, quoted as saying: "He [Griveaux] is someone who is always mentioning family values. He said he would be the mayor of Paris families and citing the example of his wife and children, while doing the opposite." Griveaux's private lawyer has reported that he will press charges.

The first round of municipal elections in France took place on 15 March 2020 against the backdrop of the government decision to move to Stage III of measures to mitigate the COVID-19 pandemic. Stringent restrictions on public life involving the closure of bars, restaurants and other businesses considered non-essential were set to begin the following day. Then-Health Minister, Agnès Buzyn, resigned on 16 February 2020 to run for the Paris mayor as the official candidate of LREM. She is succeeded by Olivier Véran, a neurologist. The decision to press ahead with the election was justified as being critical to democratic life in the country, despite concerns about when a second round could be held as the toll of infections and deaths continued to rise. In the end, the turnout of registered voters was 40%, lower than in 1971 – the previous record for lowest turnout.

Process 

The municipal elections are held independently in each of Paris's 20 boroughs (ie arrondissements) (with the central four regrouped into the Paris Centre sector).
On the first round, if a list wins an overall majority, the seats are apportioned. If no list reaches an overall majority, then a second round is organized. Any list below the 5% threshold is directly eliminated, and any list below the 10% threshold cannot qualify itself for the runoff (lists between 5% and 10% are still allowed to merge with other lists above 10%). Lists above the 10% threshold are qualified for the runoff, in which the seats are apportioned between all lists above the threshold of 5% of the votes.
In the seats apportionment, half of the seats are automatically given to the list winning the plurality as a majority bonus, and the rest of the seats are apportioned proportionally.

The elections are held onto two levels: the borough level, and the municipal level. The seats are apportioned using the same rules and the same ballots, so a candidate can be elected to both borough councilor and municipal councilor (and take both offices).
Usually, the list winning the plurality in a borough, after receiving an overall majority of the seats (due to the majority bonus), elects its head of list to sit as borough mayor.

Finally, the Council of Paris elects the mayor in three rounds, needing an absolute majority in the first two rounds, or a plurality in the third round if needed.

Polls

First round

2020

2018–19

March 2018

Second round

Results

The first round of the 2020 Paris Mayoral election saw incumbent mayor Anne Hidalgo, a Socialist, comfortably ahead with 30% of the vote. Her closest rival, conservative Rachida Dati, won 22%, while 17.7% was garnered by French President Emmanuel Macron’s official candidate, former health minister Agnes Buzyn. A dissident from Macron's party, Cedric Villani, won 8%. Hidalgo was re-elected as Mayor of Paris in the second round after receiving 50.2 percent of the vote.

This list presents the 163 councillors of Council of Paris elected in the 2014 Paris municipal election.

Arrondissements

Control of Paris' twenty arrondissements were also decided in the election. At the last election, ten were won by the Socialist Party, nine by the UMP and one by EELV.

See also 
List of Paris councillors

References

2020 elections in France
Municipal election
Elections in Paris
Elections postponed due to the COVID-19 pandemic
March 2020 events in France
Municipal elections in France